The National Tennis Center, is a tennis center located in the Olympic Green. It opened on 1 October 2007. It hosted the tennis preliminaries and finals of singles and doubles for men and women at the Beijing 2008 Olympics as well as the Paralympic wheelchair tennis competitions. In 2009, it became the home of China Open.

General information
The center is located in Beijing, just  from the Beijing National Stadium (a.k.a. The Birds Nest Stadium).

The center currently has 12 competition hard courts and 35 training courts, including 20 hard courts, 10 indoor hard courts, 2 artificial grass courts, 2 indoor clay courts, and a mini hard court.

The main court, named Diamond Court (nicknamed National Tennis Stadium), has a capacity of 15,000. The Lotus Court (10,000 capacity), Moon Court, and Brad Drewett Court all have 12 stands, which represent pedals of lotus flowers, one of the emblems of the 2008 Summer Olympics. Lotus court has a capacity of 10,000. Moon Court has a capacity of 4,000 and Brad Drewett Court has a capacity of 2,000. The courts have been specially designed for natural air ventilation to reduce the amount of air pollution entering the courts, ensuring optimal health for both athletes and spectators. It also allows the courts to be cooled and with an installation of cooling machines, the courts' temperatures can easily be reduced to five degrees Celsius. Curtains attached to the roofs of the courts also allows them to be cooled in the heat of the sun.

The project embodies the concepts of Green Olympics, Hi-Tech Olympics, and People's Olympics. It integrates design experience of world sport architecture and will be a tennis competition venue of the state of the art design in keeping with international standards.

In 2009 the China Open, which is an ATP World Tour 500 series event and a WTA Premier Mandatory tournament, moved its location to this center from its former location, the Beijing Tennis Center.

Rename
The National Tennis Center was named as The Olympic Green Tennis Center or Beijing Olympic Green Tennis Court, at the Beijing 2008 Olympics. Since it started to host the China Open, the venue was renamed to National Tennis Center in 2009.

Timeline

Before The Olympics
All courts except for the National Tennis Stadium were opened on 1 October 2007 and were tested between 6 and 20 October 2007 in the Good Luck Beijing 2007 ITF Pro Circuit, where 36 men and 44 women competed.

During The Olympics

The Courts hosted the 2008 Summer Olympics in Beijing. The following competitions were played:
 men's singles – 64-player draw
 women's singles – 64-player draw
 men's doubles – 32-player draw
 women's doubles – 32-player draw

The winners

During The Paralympics
The Courts also hosted the wheelchair tennis competitions of the 2008 Summer Paralympics in Beijing. These were played between 8 and 15 September 2008.

112 athletes (approximately 64-80 male and 32~48 female) were classified into disability group.

The competitions played included:
men's singles
women's singles
men's doubles
women's doubles
quads singles
quads doubles

The winners

After The Olympics/Paralympics
After the Beijing Olympic and Paralympic games of 2008, the center remained standing.  It did not host the 2008 China Open Tennis tournament, despite rumours it would. However, it became the new home of the China Open from 2009 onwards. A new center court, National Tennis Stadium, was completed in 2011. Featuring a retractable roof, this new court possesses a capacity of 15,000 spectators, making it the world's fifth largest tennis stadium by capacity. Lincuiqiao Station on Beijing Subway Line 8 opened in the same year, providing the closest public transport access to the tennis center.

See also
Tennis in China
 List of tennis stadiums by capacity

References

External links

Beijing Olympic Green Tennis Center venue site
World stadiums
Wikimapia

Venues of the 2008 Summer Olympics
Olympic tennis venues
Tennis venues in China
Sports venues in Beijing
Sports venues completed in 2007
Buildings and structures in Chaoyang District, Beijing
Outdoor arenas